Rajesh Singh (born 15 February 1993) is an Indian cricketer. He made his Twenty20 debut on 8 November 2019, for Bihar in the 2019–20 Syed Mushtaq Ali Trophy.

References

External links
 

1993 births
Living people
Indian cricketers
Bihar cricketers
Place of birth missing (living people)